Desulfotomaculum arcticum is a spore-forming, moderately thermophilic, sulfate-reducing bacterium. Its type strain is 15T (=DSM 17038T =JCM 12923T).

References

Further reading
Beatty, Tom J. Genome Evolution of Photosynthetic Bacteria. Vol. 66. Academic Press, 2013.
Sattley, W. Matthew. Microbiology of Sulfur Cycling and Other Biogeochemical Processes in Dry Valleys Lakes of Antarctica. ProQuest, 2006.
Adams, Michael W., et al., eds. Biochemistry and physiology of anaerobic bacteria. Springer, 2003.

External links
LPSN

Type strain of Desulfotomaculum arcticum at BacDive -  the Bacterial Diversity Metadatabase

Peptococcaceae